Cerstin Petersmann (born 27 November 1964 in Dortmund) is a German rower.

References 
 
 

1964 births
Living people
German female rowers
Sportspeople from Dortmund
Rowers at the 1988 Summer Olympics
Rowers at the 1992 Summer Olympics
Olympic bronze medalists for Germany
Olympic rowers of West Germany
Olympic rowers of Germany
Olympic medalists in rowing
Medalists at the 1992 Summer Olympics
World Rowing Championships medalists for West Germany
World Rowing Championships medalists for Germany
20th-century German women
21st-century German women